The Dying Dandy is a painting by Nils Dardel, painted in 1918, and today it is part of the collection of Moderna Museet  in Stockholm.

The work is characterized by Nils Dardel's use of intense colors and undulating forms, and is considered symbolic of superficial beauty. The form shows the influence of Matisse. Though situated like any deathbed portrait, the dying man is not looking piously towards the heavens, but into a mirror, while surrounded by mourners. A man crying into a handkerchief behind him is looking away while three women attend to the body. The meaning of the blackened mirror is ambiguous; title seems to suggest that the dying man's last thought was for his appearance, possibly meant as a parody of the deathbed portrait as a genre. In an earlier version, the dandy holds a fan and his eyes are completely closed. Dardel was no stranger to this genre and had earlier painted his Funeral in Senlis which shows how elaborate the catafalque could be at the time.

Provenance
In 1984 the painting was sold as one of Sweden's most valued works of art and generated much publicity. The high price paid by financier  at the time has been seen as symptomatic of a capitalist art market.
The price paid was 3.4 million kronor and was a record high for a Swedish art. Four years later, in 1988, Roos sold the painting for 13 million kronor, which was again considered to be very high, to the financier . The painting then ended up in the possession of the financier  after Thulin went into bankruptcy in 1991. Today it is owned by the Moderna Museet.

On April 4, 2007, a smaller version of the painting in watercolor was sold for 3.25 million crowns to a Swedish collector via auction firm Bukowskis. Dardel's work Vattenfallet (The Waterfall) sold for 25 million kronor in 2012 and was to date the most expensive modernist Swedish painting ever sold.

References

External links 
Den döende dandyn, Moderna Museet

1918 paintings
Swedish paintings
Paintings in the collection of the Moderna Museet
Post-impressionist paintings
Paintings about death